The Queens Public Library, also known as the Queens Library and Queens Borough Public Library, is one of three separate and independent public library systems in New York City. The other two are the New York Public Library (serving the Bronx, Manhattan, and Staten Island), and the Brooklyn Library (serving Brooklyn).

Libraries in Queens

See also
 List of Carnegie libraries in New York City
 List of New York Public Library branches
 List of Brooklyn Public Library branches
 Queens Memory Project

References

Further reading
 Queens Borough Public Library. 1986. Library matters: a publication of the Queens Library. Jamaica, N.Y.: The Library.

External links
 Queens College Special Collection and Archives
 Map of libraries in the Queens Borough Public Library system

Queens Public Library
Queens Public Library
Libraries in Queens, New York
Library
New York, Queens